The Exchange 106, formerly known as Signature Tower, is a 453.6-meter-tall supertall skyscraper in Kuala Lumpur, Malaysia. It is the second tallest building in Malaysia and the third tallest building in Southeast Asia. It is also the centerpiece of the new Tun Razak Exchange (TRX) financial district.

The Exchange 106 is currently the 14th tallest building in the world according to the Council on Tall Buildings and Urban Habitat (CTBUH) and the second-tallest building in Malaysia, surpassing the Petronas Twin Towers by 1.7 meters.

Proposal and development 
The skyscraper was first conceptualized when TRX was controlled by 1Malaysia Development Berhad (1MDB), a sovereign fund owned by the Government of Malaysia. On 13 May 2015, 1MDB Real Estate Sdn Bhd (1MDB RE), the master developer of TRX, and the Mulia Group announced that, through Mulia Property Development Sdn Bhd, they had signed a Sale and Purchase agreement for the development rights of the plot of land for the Exchange 106 (then known as the Signature Tower), with the land transacted at a value of RM665 million. Groundwork on the Exchange 106 plot commenced on 1 March 2016, with the mat concrete foundation laid in May 2016 (see "Progress" section below).

Presently, Mulia Property Development Sdn Bhd is 51% owned by the Ministry of Finance through MKD Signature Sdn Bhd and 49% by Mulia International.

Progress 
The Exchange 106 was managed by the Mulia Group, with structural construction carried out by the China State Construction Engineering Corporation, through its Malaysian subsidiary China State Construction Engineering (M) Sdn. Bhd.

In May 2016, the tower's foundation concrete pour took place over a weekend and was the second-largest continuous concrete pour in the world. In December 2017, the building was structurally topped out, 19 months after commencement, achieving an average of 3 days a floor.

Exchange 106 achieved its Certificate of Completion and Compliance in September 2019.

The construction of the TRX's shopping mall (known as The Exchange TRX) which is located at the foot of the Exchange 106 is expected to be completed by the third quarter of 2021. Later on, the construction of the mall was delayed due to the strict Movement Control Order (MCO) in the country caused by the COVID-19 pandemic. The completion of the mall was pushed back to 2022.

As of December 2021, the overall infrastructure of TRX is at 80 percent completion, while The Exchange TRX mall is expected to be completed in the fourth quarter of 2022.

Criticism 
The tower, along with Merdeka 118, has often been referred by many Malaysians as highly unnecessary and a "national disgrace", with their presence on the Kuala Lumpur skyline "tainted" and signifying the legacy of the scandal.

Gallery

Transportation 
The skyscraper is currently served only by the Kajang Line with one station, the  Tun Razak Exchange MRT underground station on site.

The underground station will also be a stop on the  Putrajaya Line (SSP), scheduled to open in December 2022 or January 2023. This station is one of two interchanges between the Kajang and Putrajaya MRT lines.

See also 
 Tun Razak Exchange
 List of tallest buildings in Malaysia
 List of tallest buildings in Kuala Lumpur
 List of tallest buildings in the world
 List of buildings with 100 floors or more

References 

Skyscrapers in Kuala Lumpur
Postmodern architecture in Malaysia
Skyscraper hotels in Kuala Lumpur
Skyscraper office buildings in Kuala Lumpur
Residential skyscrapers in Malaysia
Buildings and structures completed in 2019